Twin Lakes is a census-designated place in the townships of Little Elbow and Twin Lakes, Mahnomen County, Minnesota, United States. Its population was 149 as of the 2010 census.

Demographics

Education
The community is served by Mahnomen ISD 432.

References

Census-designated places in Mahnomen County, Minnesota
Census-designated places in Minnesota